Petaling Jaya Inner Ring Road (PJIRR) is an urban and municipal thoroughfare ring road in Petaling Jaya, Selangor, Malaysia, consisting of Jalan Sultan, Jalan Barat, Jalan Utara and Jalan Timur.

Landmarks
Wisma Persekutuan Petaling Jaya (Petaling Jaya Federal Building)
Menara PKNS
Wisma MCIS Zurich
Stamford College
Hilton Petaling Jaya
Asia Jaya
Tun Hussein Onn National Eye Hospital
Luther Centre
FINAS (formerly known as Filem Negara Malaysia)
Crystal Crown Hotel Petaling Jaya
TNB Building Petaling Jaya

List of junctions

Roads in Petaling Jaya